The 1980 IBF World Championships were held in Jakarta, Indonesia in 1980. Following the results of the  women's singles.

Main stage

Section 1

Section 2

Section 3

Section 4

Final stage

External links 
https://eresources.nlb.gov.sg/newspapers/Digitised/Page/straitstimes19800528.1.26
https://eresources.nlb.gov.sg/newspapers/Digitised/Page/straitstimes19800529.1.28
https://eresources.nlb.gov.sg/newspapers/Digitised/Page/straitstimes19800530.1.34
https://eresources.nlb.gov.sg/newspapers/Digitised/Page/straitstimes19800531.1.30

1980 IBF World Championships
IBF